In mathematics, ideal theory is the theory of ideals in commutative rings. While the notion of an ideal exists also for non-commutative rings, a much more substantial theory exists only for commutative rings (and this article therefore only considers ideals in commutative rings.)

Throughout the articles, rings refer to commutative rings. See also the article ideal (ring theory) for basic operations such as sum or products of ideals.

Ideals in a finitely generated algebra over a field 

Ideals in a finitely generated algebra over a field (that is, a quotient of a polynomial ring over a field) behave somehow nicer than those in a general commutative ring. This may be thought of as an extension of Hilbert's Nullstellensatz, which concerns the case when  is a polynomial ring.

Topology determined by an ideal 

If I is an ideal in a ring A, then it determines the topology on A where a subset U of A is open if, for each x in U,

for some integer . This topology is called the I-adic topology. It is also called an a-adic topology if  is generated by an element .

For example, take , the ring of integers and  an ideal generated by a prime number p. Then, clearly,

where  denotes an open ball of radius  with center . As a metric space,  can be completed.

Ideal class group 
In a Dedekind domain A (e.g., a ring of integers in a number field or the coordinate ring of a smooth affine curve) with the field of fractions , an ideal  is invertible in the sense: there exists a fractional ideal  (that is, an A-submodule of ) such that , where the product on the left is a product of submodules of K. In other words, fractional ideals form a group under a product. The quotient of the group of fractional ideals by the subgroup of principal ideals is then the ideal class group of A.

In a general ring, an ideal may not be invertible (in fact, already the definition of a fractional ideal is not clear). However, over a Noetherian integral domain, it is still possible to develop some theory generalizing the situation in Dedekind domains. For example, Ch. VII of Bourbaki's Algèbre commutative gives such a theory.

The ideal class group of A, when it can be defined, is closely related to the Picard group of the spectrum of A (often the two are the same; e.g., for Dedekind domains).

In algebraic number theory, especially in class field theory, it is more convenient to use a generalization of an ideal class group called an idele class group.

Closure operations 

There are several operations on ideals that play roles of closures. The most basic one is the radical of an ideal. Another is the Integral closure of an ideal. It is also a closure operation.

Given ideals  in a ring , the ideal

See also tight closure.

Reduction theory

Local cohomology in ideal theory 

Local cohomology can sometimes be used to obtain information on an ideal. This section assumes some familiarity with sheaf theory and scheme theory.

Let  be a module over a ring  and  an ideal. Unwinding the definition, one sees:
.

See also 
System of parameters

References

 Eisenbud, David, Commutative Algebra with a View Toward Algebraic Geometry, Graduate Texts in Mathematics, 150, Springer-Verlag, 1995, .
 

Ideals (ring theory)
History of mathematics
Commutative algebra